Rashtriya Samajwadi Congress (RSC) was a political party in the Indian state of West Bengal from 1986 to 1989. RSC was founded by Indian National Congress leader Pranab Mukherjee who was the former President of India, as a result of the leadership struggle within the Indian National Congress after the demise of Indira Gandhi. Mukherjee was opposed to Rajiv Gandhi being appointed the prime minister of India. He saw himself as the rightful successor to the post due to his seniority within the party and was opposed to the dynastic nature of the transition.

The RSC rejoined the INC in 1989 after it was unsuccessful in attracting major political figures to its fold and unable to garner wide support. This may have been due to Mukherjee not being a mass leader and never having contested elections. On his return to the party he was welcomed and again joined the top leadership. Since then he has built up an image of a Nehru–Gandhi family loyalist.

See also
 Indian National Congress breakaway parties

Notes

Defunct political parties in West Bengal
Defunct socialist parties in India
Political parties established in 1986
1986 establishments in West Bengal
Political parties disestablished in 1989
1989 disestablishments in India
Indian National Congress breakaway groups